Robert Edward Bell  (November 29, 1918 – April 1, 1992) was a Canadian nuclear physicist and principal of McGill University from 1970 to 1979.

Biography
Born in New Malden, England to Canadian parents, he was raised in Ladner, British Columbia. He received a Bachelor of Arts in mathematics and physics in 1939 and a M.A. in physics in 1941 from the University of British Columbia. During World War II he researched VHF, UHF radar and microwave antennas for military purposes at the National Research Council Laboratories in Ottawa. After the war, from 1946 to 1952, he worked at the Chalk River Nuclear Energy Laboratory in Ontario in nuclear physics research and received a PhD degree in physics from McGill University in 1948.

Between 1956 and 1960 he was an associate professor at McGill University. From 1958 to 1959 he worked in Copenhagen, Denmark at the Niels Bohr Institute. In 1960 he was named Rutherford Professor of Physics and Director of the Foster Radiation Laboratory at McGill. Between 1964 and 1967 he was Vice-Dean for Physical Sciences. In 1969 he became Dean of Graduate Studies and Research and in 1970 he was appointed Principal and Vice-Chancellor. In 1979 he returned to the Physics Department leaving McGill in 1983. From 1978 until 1981, he was president of the Royal Society of Canada. From 1981 to 1990 he was a Canadian delegate to the science council of NATO.

Honours
 In 1954 he was elected a Fellow of the American Physical Society
 In 1955 he was made a Fellow of the Royal Society of Canada.
 In 1965 he was named a Fellow of the Royal Society.
 In 1971 he was made a Companion of the Order of Canada.
 In 1978 he was awarded a Doctor of Science, honoris causa, from the University of British Columbia.
 In 1978 he was awarded the Queen Elizabeth II Silver Jubilee Medal
 In 1979 he received an honorary doctorate from Concordia University.

References

External links
 Robert Edward Bell at The Canadian Encyclopedia
 
 

Canadian physicists
Canadian nuclear physicists
Companions of the Order of Canada
Canadian Fellows of the Royal Society
Fellows of the Royal Society of Canada
McGill University Faculty of Science alumni
People from Delta, British Columbia
Principals of McGill University
University of British Columbia Faculty of Science alumni
1918 births
1992 deaths
British emigrants to Canada
Presidents of the Canadian Association of Physicists